Gerard Douis (born 29 February 1952) is a French archer. He competed in the men's individual event at the 1984 Summer Olympics.

References

1952 births
Living people
French male archers
Olympic archers of France
Archers at the 1984 Summer Olympics
Place of birth missing (living people)